MLN may refer to:

Markov logic network
Midlothian, historic county in Scotland, Chapman code
Minuteman Library Network
Modern Language Notes, a US journal of European literature
Melilla Airport, Melilla, Spain, IATA code
Movement of National Liberation, Mexico, 1960s
Former National Liberation Movement (Guatemala)
National Liberation Movement (Panama)

See also
National Liberation Movement (disambiguation)